Ocean Monarch is the name of a number of ships.

 , a barque that caught fire in 1848 with the loss of nearly 180 lives
 , Russell and Co., Port Glasgow.
 , a Furness, Withy ship
 , a Shaw, Savill & Albion ship
 Ocean Monarch (1955), the previous name of the cruise ship Princess Daphne

Ship names